Ricky Lalthlamuana (born 11 October 1984) is an Indian cricketer. He made his List A debut on 27 February 2021, for Mizoram in the 2020–21 Vijay Hazare Trophy.

References

External links
 

1984 births
Living people
Indian cricketers
Mizoram cricketers
Place of birth missing (living people)